The Cherokee Strip Regional Heritage Center (CSRHC) is a museum in Enid, Oklahoma, that focuses on the history of the Cherokee Outlet and the Land Run of September 16, 1893. Previously named the Museum of the Cherokee Strip, the museum has undergone renovations expanding the museum space to 24,000 square feet. The Cherokee Strip Regional Heritage Center is home to permanent and temporary exhibit galleries, a research center, and the Humphrey Heritage Village.

History
The Museum of the Cherokee Strip was officially opened on September 13, 1975. The Garfield County Historical Society, Sons and Daughters of the Cherokee Strip Pioneers, and Cherokee Strip Historical Society preserved and collected historical artifacts from Cherokee Outlet which are displayed at the museum.

In 2005, through a partnership between the Oklahoma Historical Society, the Sons and Daughters of the Cherokee Strip, and the Phillips Legacy Foundation, the Cherokee Strip Regional Heritage Center, Inc. was formed to build a new facility. The Cherokee Strip Regional Heritage was opened to the public on April 1, 2011.

The Heritage Center is operated by the Oklahoma Historical Society.

Galleries and Exhibits 

Permanent exhibits tell the story of early settlement of the region after the Land Run of 1893, the development of agriculture, the discovery of oil, and the early rail industry in the region. Additional exhibits focus on Phillips University and Enid, Oklahoma history.

The Heritage Center has a temporary exhibit gallery that houses traveling exhibitions. At a gala on September 16, 2010, the museums featuring David Fitzgerald's "Cherokee Nation: Portrait of a People" photography exhibit. It was the museum's first exhibit in its temporary exhibit hall, which predated the opening of the rest of the permanent exhibits.

Research Center 
The Heritage Center houses a research center with an archival collection that includes photographs, oral histories, newspapers, genealogical information, and a reference library. A full-time archivist is on staff to help visitors with research requests.

Humphrey Heritage Village 
The Humphrey Heritage Village is a living history village on the grounds of the Cherokee Strip Regional Heritage Center. The village includes historic buildings from northwestern Oklahoma, such as Enid's U.S. Land Office from the Land Run of 1893. Other buildings include the Glidewell house, Enid's first Episcopal church, and the Turkey Creek School House.

See also
Regional heritage
Oklahoma Historical Society
Cherokee Outlet

References

External links
 Cherokee Strip Regional Heritage Center - Official website
Cherokee Strip Regional Heritage Center - Oklahoma Historical Society, Museums and Historic Sites website

Buildings and structures in Enid, Oklahoma
Museums in Garfield County, Oklahoma
History museums in Oklahoma
Oklahoma Historical Society
Tourist attractions in Enid, Oklahoma
Museums established in 1975
1975 establishments in Oklahoma